Peter Burling may refer to:

 Peter Burling (politician) (born 1945), American politician
 Peter Burling (sailor) (born 1991), New Zealand sailor